Balionebris is a genus of moths in the family Agonoxenidae, with a single species.

Species
Balionebris bacteriota Meyrick, 1935

References
Natural History Museum Lepidoptera genus database

Agonoxeninae
Monotypic moth genera